Ronnie Wood (born 13 November 1960) is a retired Scottish professional ice hockey player who played between 1980 and 1993 in the United Kingdom. He is credited, with David Gardner-Brown, for creating the Sheffield Steelers in 1991, for whom he was also the General Manager between 1991 and February 1993.

Playing career
After making his senior level debut in the 1980–81 season for the Murrayfield Racers, who he helped to win the Northern League, Wood joined the Dundee Rockets for the 1981–82 season. He played for Dundee for the next six season, helping them to win the Northern League and the Scottish National League in 1981–82, the Autumn Cup in 1983, the British Hockey League in 1982–83 and 1983–84 and the playoffs in 1982, 1983 and 1984.

Wood joined the Fife Flyers for the 1987–88 and 1988–89 seasons before he joined the Tayside Tigers for the end of the 1988–89 season. He then joined the Solihull Barons for the start of the 1989–90 season, which he finished with the Ayr Bruins before returning to Solihull for the 1990–91 season.

After Solihull folded in 1991, he helped form the Sheffield Steelers with David Gardner-Brown and played for them for the next two seasons, helping them gain promotion from English League Division 1 to the British League Division 1 and then the Premier Division.
In 1998 Wood moved to South Africa where he coaches at club, Provincial and National Team level. He has coached South African Senior National men's team To Silver in I.I.H.F.World s Div 3 and is currently coaching in Cape Town.

Honours and awards
Named to the Northern League All Star B Team in 1981.
Named to the BHL All Star Second Team in 1983 and 1984.
Named to the BHL Premier Division British Players All Star Team in 1987.
Number 7 jersey retired by Sheffield Steelers.

Records
Most goals (58) and points (91) for the Murrayfield Racers in 1980–81.

Career statistics

Footnotes

References
A to Z Encyclopaedia of Ice Hockey
European Hockey.Net
Ice Hockey Journalists UK
The Internet Hockey Database

External links
 

1960 births
Dundee Rockets players
Fife Flyers players
Living people
Murrayfield Racers players
Place of birth missing (living people)
Scottish ice hockey forwards
Sheffield Steelers players